James Benjamin Wilson (June 17, 1891 – death unknown), nicknamed "Little Ben", was an American Negro league outfielder in the 1920s.

A native of New York, New York, Wilson made his Negro leagues debut in 1923 with the Lincoln Giants. He played for the Lincoln club through 1925, and also played for the Bacharach Giants in 1925, his final professional season.

References

External links
 and Seamheads

1891 births
Year of death missing
Place of death missing
Bacharach Giants players
Lincoln Giants players
Baseball outfielders